Daniel S. ("Danny") Nevins (born March 18, 1966) is an American rabbi and a leader in the Conservative Movement who is head of school at Golda Och Academy in West Orange, NJ  On January 29, 2007, Rabbi Nevins was named the Dean of the Rabbinical School of the Jewish Theological Seminary of America, succeeding Rabbi William Lebeau.  In 2021, it was announced that Rabbi Nevins would be stepping down as dean of the JTS Rabbinical School.   He was previously the spiritual leader of Adat Shalom Synagogue in Farmington Hills, Michigan, where he served for 13 years in his first pulpit. He is an authority on Jewish Law who co-authored a responsum (legal opinion) that was passed by the Conservative Movement's Committee on Jewish Law and Standards paving the way for the Conservative Movement to allow gay marriage and to ordain lesbian and gay rabbis.

Biography 
Nevins grew up in River Vale, New Jersey. He attended the Frisch School, and then Yeshivat HaMivtar in Jerusalem. In 1989, he graduated from Harvard College with a bachelor's degree magna cum laude in history. He earned a masters in Jewish studies from the Jewish Theological Seminary of America in 1991 and was ordained as a rabbi in 1994. Nevins also received a graduate fellowship from the Wexner Foundation in Columbus, Ohio. His writings may be found at www.rabbinevins.com.

Nevins serves on the Rabbinical Assembly's International Executive Council and is also a member of its Committee on Jewish Law and Standards, where he chairs a subcommittee on disabilities and Jewish law. He has written responsa on the participation of Jews who are blind in the Torah service, on contemporary criteria for the determination of death, on electricity and Shabbat, gene editing, lab-grown meat, and artificial intelligence. Together with Rabbis Elliot Dorff and Avram Israel Reisner, he authored the responsum on Homosexuality, Human Dignity and Halakha. He is past president of the Michigan region of the Rabbinical Assembly, of the Farmington Area Interfaith Association, and of the ecumenical Michigan Board of Rabbis. Rabbi Nevins was a founding board member of the Jewish Academy of Metropolitan Detroit, now the Frankel Jewish Academy, and the Detroit chapter of the National Coalition for Community and Justice. He was awarded the 2006 Reverend James Lyon's Dove Award by the Dove Institute for his leadership in interfaith understanding.

Rabbi Nevins has written on the subject of mamzerut, disagreeing with an approach that would declare the category inoperative and proposing instead an approach more in line with the halakhic methodology used by Orthodox Rabbi Ovadia Yosef used to discredit and exclude potential evidence of mamzer status. He noted that this approach would cover virtually all cases of inquiry in the types of situations a congregational rabbi would be likely to experience, and suggesting that Conservative rabbis should similarly not abolish or declare opposition to problematic Biblical categories but should rabbinically limit their scope and effect.

His responsum on blind Torah readers argued that while Torah reading can be performed for the congregation only by a sighted reader from a kosher Torah scroll, people who are blind have many other options for leadership in the service. They may serve as a prayer leader (shaliach tzibbur), chant haftarah, and receive aliyot to the Torah. They may also serve as a meturgaman, translating the Torah as the Talmudic blind sage Rav Yosef did. Nevins also allowed that a blind reader could use a braille text to chant the maftir portion for the congregation. Should future technologies allow a blind person to read directly from the scroll, that might satisfy the Talmudic requirement of chanting "min haketav" (from the script).

The responsum on brain death argued that Jewish law has long favored respiratory criteria for the determination of death, rather than cardiac standstill. Contemporary protocols of declaring brain death culminate in the apnea test, in which the patient is removed from a ventilator. If carbon dioxide levels in the blood rise to a determined level, then the patient is deemed permanently incapable of respiration and is declared dead. This protocol, Nevins argued, also satisfied the halakhic requirement that a patient is shown to be permanently incapable of respiration in order to be considered dead. The persistence of heartbeat while the patient is artificially ventilated is to be considered pirkus (post-mortem convulsions). A patient declared dead in this manner may be removed from artificial support systems, and his or her vital organs may be donated with permission from the family in order to save the lives of other people.

The opinion on homosexuality noted that sexual orientation has been shown to be an integral part of human identity that is largely impervious to change, forcing homosexuals who wish to be observant Jews to attempt to live celibate lives. This state of affairs has imposed terrible suffering and indignity on gay and lesbian people, their families, friends and communities. Rabbis Nevins, Dorff and Reisner demonstrated that the biblical prohibition is limited to anal sex between men, whereas the broader prohibitions on gay and lesbian intimacy were instituted by the rabbis in Midrash Sifra. Although Maimonides and the Tur/Shulchan Arukh viewed the resulting prohibition as biblical, Nachmanides argued that it is a rabbinic interpolation. This distinction is significant, because rabbinic prohibitions may be set aside in cases where human dignity is undermined by a rabbinic norm. This principle of "Gadol Kvod habriot shedocheh lo ta'aseh baTorah" (so great is human dignity that it supersedes a prohibition of Torah) is found in Talmud Brakhot 19b and many other places in rabbinic literature and law. For example, Rabbi Eliezer Waldenberg used this principle to allow hearing-impaired Jews to use battery-operated hearing aids on Shabbat. Rabbis Nevins, Dorff and Reisner argued that for gay and lesbian Jews, the demand that they lead solitary lives with no possibility for social or sexual intimacy was a violation of their dignity. For this reason, the accretion of rabbinic prohibitions could be waived on their behalf by the CJLS, with only the explicit biblical ban on male anal sex remaining in force. This decision, which was approved by a majority vote of 13-12, specifically permitted gay and lesbian Jews to be ordained as rabbis and cantors, and also allowed for ceremonies of same-sex commitment. However, it did not equate such ceremonies with traditional Jewish marriage (kiddushin). A committee of the Rabbinical Assembly is working to define the parameters of commitment ceremonies with pin the jurisdiction of this psak halakhah (legal decision).

Rabbi Nevins has been an active leader in the broader Jewish community and an ambassador to peoples of other faiths. He led a group of Protestant and Catholic leaders on a May 2005 trip that included Pope Benedict XVI's first public audience, Holocaust Memorial Day at Titus's Arch in Rome and a week in Israel.

Rabbi Nevins joined a new leadership team at the Jewish Theological Seminary headed by Chancellor Arnold Eisen and provost Alan Cooper in 2007. 

On July 1, 2021, Rabbi Nevins became the 8th Head of School at Golda Och Academy in West Orange, NJ, succeeding Mr. Adam Shapiro.

Rabbi Nevins and his family live in New York City.

See also
Conservative Judaism

References

External links 
 Adat Shalom Synagogue
 The Jewish Theological Seminary
 Rabbi Danny Nevins
 Golda Och Academy

Living people
1966 births
American Conservative rabbis
Frisch School alumni
Harvard College alumni
Jewish Theological Seminary of America semikhah recipients
People from River Vale, New Jersey
20th-century American rabbis
21st-century American rabbis